Carl Friedrich Kotschy (26 January 1789 – 9 February 1856) was an Austrian Protestant theologian and botanist born in Teschen (today Cieszyn, Poland). He was the father of botanist Theodor Kotschy (1813-1866).

From 1807 to 1810 he studied theology and botany at the University of Leipzig, and afterwards travelled through France and Switzerland. In Switzerland he met with renowned educator Johann Heinrich Pestalozzi (1746-1827).

From 1810 until his death he worked as a minister in Ustroń, a predominantly Polish-speaking town in the Cieszyn Silesian region of Austria. Here he translated Czech and German language works into Polish, and penned instructional books in Polish for elementary schools. He was also the author of several religious works, including a revision of the Lutheran catechism (1833) and a book of Biblical stories (1844).

As a botanist, he performed studies of local flora, especially vegetation native to the Silesian Beskids. He specialized in the field of pomology, publishing in 1844 a book on fruit orchards.

He was 1848/49 also Member of the Frankfurt Parliament.

His son was Theodor Kotschy.

References 
 The Lutheran Parish in Ustroń (translated biography)

1789 births
1856 deaths
19th-century Austrian botanists
Austrian Protestant theologians
Polish Lutheran theologians
19th-century Protestant theologians
Pomologists
19th-century Polish botanists
Austrian people of Polish descent
People from Cieszyn Silesia
People from Cieszyn
Polish Lutheran clergy